The Jewish Shelter Home, also known as Elmer Colwell House, located in southwest Portland, Oregon, is listed on the National Register of Historic Places.

See also
 National Register of Historic Places listings in Southwest Portland, Oregon

References

1919 establishments in Oregon
Jews and Judaism in Portland, Oregon
National Register of Historic Places in Portland, Oregon
Portland Historic Landmarks
Southwest Portland, Oregon